The Diphyidae are a family of siphonophores. These are colonial siphonophores with two nectophores (swimming bells) arranged one behind the other. The front one includes a somatocyst (extension of the gastrovascular system), while the hind one does not. The somatocyst often contains an oil droplet for buoyancy control. A nectosac (central cavity with muscular walls) in each nectophore allows the organism to swim efficiently.

Systematics
The World Register of Marine Species includes the following taxa in the family Diphyidae:

Subfamily Diphyinae Quoy & Gaimard, 1827 
 Genus Chelophyes Totton, 1932
 Chelophyes appendiculata (Eschscholtz, 1829)
 Chelophyes contorta (Lens & van Riemsdijk, 1908)
 Genus Dimophyes Moser, 1925
 Dimophyes arctica (Chun, 1897)
 Genus Diphyes Cuvier, 1817
 Diphyes antarctica Moser, 1925
 Diphyes bojani (Eschscholtz, 1825)
 Diphyes chamissonis Huxley, 1859
 Diphyes dispar Chamisso & Eysenhardt, 1821
 Genus Eudoxoides Huxley, 1859
 Eudoxoides mitra (Huxley, 1859)
 Eudoxoides spiralis (Bigelow, 1911)
 Genus Lensia Totton, 1932
 Lensia achilles Totton, 1941
 Lensia ajax Totton, 1941
 Lensia asymmetrica Stepanjants, 1970
 Lensia campanella (Moser, 1917)
 Lensia challengeri Totton, 1954
 Lensia conoidea (Keferstein & Ehlers, 1860)
 Lensia cordata Totton, 1965
 Lensia cossack Totton, 1941
 Lensia exeter Totton, 1941
 Lensia fowleri (Bigelow, 1911)
 Lensia gnanamuthui Daniel & Daniel, 1963
 Lensia grimaldii Leloup, 1933
 Lensia hardy Totton, 1941
 Lensia havock Totton, 1941
 Lensia hostile Totton, 1941
 Lensia hotspur Totton, 1941
 Lensia hunter Totton, 1941
 Lensia leloupi Totton, 1954
 Lensia lelouveteau Totton, 1941
 Lensia meteori (Leloup, 1934)
 Lensia multicristata (Moser, 1925)
 Lensia panikkari Daniel, 1971
 Lensia quadriculata Pages, Flood & Youngbluth, 2006
 Lensia subtilis (Chun, 1886)
 Lensia subtiloides (Lens & van Riemsdijk, 1908)
 Lensia zenkevitchi Margulis, 1970
 Genus Muggiaea Busch, 1851
 Muggiaea atlantica Cunningham, 1892
 Muggiaea bargmannae Totton, 1954
 Muggiaea delsmani Totton, 1954
 Muggiaea kochii (Will, 1844)
 Subfamily Giliinae Pugh & Pages, 1995 
 Genus Gilia Pugh & Pages, 1995
 Gilia reticulata (Totton, 1954)
 Subfamily Sulculeolariinae Totton, 1954
 Genus Sulculeolaria Blainville, 1830
 Sulculeolaria biloba (Sars, 1846)
 Sulculeolaria chuni (Lens & van Riemsdijk, 1908)
 Sulculeolaria monoica (Chun, 1888)
 Sulculeolaria quadrivalvis de Blainville, 1830
 Sulculeolaria turgida (Gegenbaur, 1854)

References

 
Calycophorae
Cnidarian families